Thomas John Bright Robinson (August 12, 1868 – January 27, 1958) was a Republican U.S. Representative from Iowa's 3rd congressional district. Elected in an era in which Republicans held every Iowa U.S. House seat, Robinson served five terms before losing in the 1932 general election.

Born in New Diggings, Wisconsin, Robinson moved with his parents to Hampton, Iowa, in 1870.  He attended the public schools and the Hampton High School. A farmer, Robinson also served as president of the Citizens National Bank of Hampton from 1907 to 1923, as a member of the Hampton Board of Education, and on the board of trustees of Cornell College in Mount Vernon, Iowa.

Robinson was elected to one four-year term in the Iowa Senate in 1912, and served as delegate to many Republican State conventions.

In 1922, Robinson was elected as a Republican to represent Iowa's 3rd congressional district in the U.S. House. During the 1920s, no Democrat was elected to any of Iowa's U.S. House seats, and every incumbent Republican congressman from Iowa who was renominated by their party was elected in the November general election. However, in 1932, the Roosevelt landslide carried many Democrats into the House, and the former Republican majority lost 101 seats.  Running for a sixth consecutive term, Robinson lost a close race to Albert C. Willford. Robinson had served in the Sixty-eighth and the four succeeding Congresses, serving from March 4, 1923 to March 3, 1933.

Returning to Iowa, Robinson engaged in the real estate and investment business.  He died in Hampton on January 27, 1958, and was interred in Hampton Cemetery.

References

External links

1868 births
1958 deaths
People from New Diggings, Wisconsin
People from Hampton, Iowa
Republican Party Iowa state senators
American bankers
American real estate businesspeople
American chief executives
Businesspeople from Iowa
Republican Party members of the United States House of Representatives from Iowa